Racaille is an Old French term meaning outcast or rabble, and may refer to:

La Racaille, a Montreal Roller Derby team
Racaille, a term describing rioters in France's 2005 civil unrest

See also
Kaillera, verlan of Racaille
Rocaille, an 18th-century French style